Performance art in China has grown since the 1970s as a response to the very traditional nature of Chinese state-run art schools. It has become more popular in spite of the fact that it is currently outlawed. In 1999 the importance of contemporary Chinese art was recognized by the inclusion of 19 contemporary Chinese artists in the Venice Biennale. In recent years many of these artists have made performances specifically for photography or film.

Examples
Some of the more extreme examples of Chinese performance art have become notorious in the West. In 2000, Zhu Yu, a painter and performance artist from Cheng Du, created a scandal by taking a number of photographs of himself, supposedly eating a foetus as a protest against state abortions as a means of population control. Peng Yu and Sun Yuan have also worked with human body parts as well as with live animals and are equally notorious. Some younger performance artists who have exhibited widely in the west in 2005-6 are Shu Yang, the organiser  of the Dadao Live Art Festival in Beijing, Yang Zhichao, famous for having his identity card number branded on his back and Wang Chuyu who went on hunger strike as part of an exhibition called Fuck Off that took place in Shanghai in 2000 in opposition to the Shanghai Biennale. They acknowledge a debt to older performance artist and curator Ai Weiwei. Other well-known artists are Ma Liuming, Zhu Ming, and He Yunchang.

The 1996 film Frozen (Chinese title: Jidu Hanleng; 极度寒冷) by Chinese director Wang Xiaoshuai, made under the pseudonym Wu Ming, has as its protagonists a group of Chinese performance artists, who are shown engaging in several street performances in the film.

Chinese performance artists
Ai Weiwei
Chen Shaoxiong
He Yunchang
Ma Liuming
Sun Yuan & Peng Yu
Shu Yang
 Wang Chuyu
Wang Xiaoshuai
Yang Zhichao
Yuan Cai and Jian Jun Xi
Xie Deqing
Zheng Lianjie
Zhu Yu
Zhang Huan
Zhu Ming

Chinese performance artist collectives
Concept 21

Chinese art
China
Chinese performing arts